The 1992 European Cup was the 28th edition of the European Cup, IIHF's premier European club ice hockey tournament. The season started on October 9, 1992, and finished on December 30, 1992.

The tournament was won by Malmö IF, who beat Dynamo Moscow in the final.

First group round

Group A
(Sofia, Bulgaria)

Group A standings

Group B
(Piešťany, Slovak Republic, Czechoslovakia)

Group B standings

Group C
(Herning, Denmark)

Group C standings

Group D
(Villach, Carinthia, Austria)

Group D standings

Group E
(Blackburn, England, United Kingdom)

Group E standings

Group F
(Oświęcim, Poland)

Group F standings

 Lion Mediolanum Milano,
 Rouen HC,
 SC Bern,
 Düsseldorfer EG,
 Dynamo Moscow,  Malmö IF   :  bye

Second group round

Group G
(Rouen, France)

Group G standings

Group H
(Milan, Italy)

Group H standings

Group J
(Helsinki, Finland)

Group J standings

Final stage
(Düsseldorf, North Rhine-Westphalia, Germany)

Third round

Group 1

Group 1 standings

Group 2

Group 2 standings

Third place match

Final

References
 Season 1992

1
IIHF European Cup